Diane Roy (born January 9, 1971) is a Canadian wheelchair racer. Between 1996 and 2016 she competed at six consecutive Paralympics and five consecutive world championships and won 11 medals, including a gold medal in the marathon at the 2006 World Championships.

Career
The 2004 Summer Olympics featured a demonstration of the women's 800 m wheelchair event, in which Roy finished fourth. She also participated in the 2004 Summer Paralympics, taking a bronze medal in both the 400 metre and 1500 metre races.

At the 2008 Summer Paralympics Roy was initially awarded the gold medal in the 5000 m T54. However a re-run of the race was ordered by the International Paralympic Committee following protests by the Australian, US and Swiss teams after six competitors were involved in a crash on the penultimate lap. The re-run race resulted in the same three athletes winning medals but in a different order, with Roy placing second.

In 2009, she was inducted into the Terry Fox Hall of Fame.

Personal life
Roy spent the majority of her childhood on a farm in Lac-des-Aigles, Quebec. She is the seventh of eight children, having five brothers and two sisters. Once she entered high school, Roy developed an interest in several sports, including basketball, badminton, downhill skiing, tennis, and handball in particular, which she played until her last year of high school. At age 17, an all terrain vehicle accident left Roy with a paralyzing injury and without the use of her legs. It halted her activities temporarily.

Since about 1998 Roy works as an administrative assistant for Royal LePage. She has a son Émile.

References

External links

 
 
 
 

1971 births
Living people
People from Bas-Saint-Laurent
Sportspeople from Quebec
Olympic wheelchair racers of Canada
Wheelchair racers at the 2000 Summer Olympics
Wheelchair racers at the 2004 Summer Olympics
Paralympic track and field athletes of Canada
Paralympic wheelchair racers
Athletes (track and field) at the 1996 Summer Paralympics
Athletes (track and field) at the 2000 Summer Paralympics
Athletes (track and field) at the 2004 Summer Paralympics
Athletes (track and field) at the 2008 Summer Paralympics
Athletes (track and field) at the 2012 Summer Paralympics
Athletes (track and field) at the 2016 Summer Paralympics
Medalists at the 2004 Summer Paralympics
Medalists at the 2008 Summer Paralympics
Paralympic silver medalists for Canada
Paralympic bronze medalists for Canada
Canadian female wheelchair racers
Canadian Disability Hall of Fame
Athletes (track and field) at the 2006 Commonwealth Games
Athletes (track and field) at the 2014 Commonwealth Games
Commonwealth Games gold medallists for Canada
Commonwealth Games silver medallists for Canada
World record holders in Paralympic athletics
Commonwealth Games medallists in athletics
Athletes (track and field) at the 2018 Commonwealth Games
People with paraplegia
Paralympic medalists in athletics (track and field)
Medalists at the 2015 Parapan American Games
Medallists at the 2006 Commonwealth Games
Medallists at the 2014 Commonwealth Games
Medallists at the 2018 Commonwealth Games